Beauty and Sadness may refer to:

 Beauty and Sadness (EP), a 1983 EP by The Smithereens
 Beauty and Sadness (novel), a 1964 novel by Yasunari Kawabata